Monchy may refer to:

Places
 Monchy, Saint Lucia, a town in Saint Lucia
 Monchy, Saskatchewan, a former settlement in Saskatchewan, Canada

France
 Monchy-au-Bois, a commune in the Pas-de-Calais department
 Monchy-Breton, a commune in the Pas-de-Calais department
 Monchy-Cayeux, a commune in the Pas-de-Calais department
 Monchy-Humières, a commune in the Oise department
 Monchy-Lagache, a commune in the Somme department
 Monchy-le-Preux, a commune in the Pas-de-Calais department
 Monchy-le-Preux (hamlet), a hamlet in the Seine-Maritime department
 Monchy-Saint-Éloi, a commune in the Oise department
 Monchy-sur-Eu, a commune in the Seine-Maritime department

Other uses
 Monchy & Alexandra, a Dominican bachata musical group, active 1998–2008